The 2017–18 Baylor Bears basketball team represented Baylor University in the 2017–18 NCAA Division I men's basketball season. This was head coach Scott Drew's 15th season at Baylor. The Bears competed in the Big 12 Conference and played their home games at the Ferrell Center in Waco, TX. They finished the season 19–15 overall and 8–10 in Big 12 play, finishing in a four-way tie for sixth place. As the No. 6 seed in the Big 12 tournament, they were defeated by West Virginia in the quarterfinals. They were one of the last four teams not selected for the NCAA tournament and as a result earned a no. 1 seed in the National Invitation Tournament, where they defeated Wagner in the first round before losing to Mississippi State in the second round.

Previous season
The Bears finished the 2016–17 season 27–8, 12–6 in Big 12 play to finish in a tie for second place. They lost to Kansas State in the quarterfinals of the Big 12 tournament. They received an at-large bid to the NCAA tournament as a No. 3 seed. They defeated No. 14 seeded New Mexico State and No. 11 seeded USC in the first and second rounds before losing to No. 7 seeded South Carolina in the sweet sixteen.

Offseason

Departures

Incoming transfers

2017 recruiting class

2018 recruiting class

Roster

Schedule and results

|-
!colspan=9 style="background:#; color:#;"|Exhibition

|-
!colspan=9 style="background:#; color:#;"|Regular season

|-
! colspan=9 style="background:#;"| Big 12 tournament

|-
! colspan=9 style="background:#;"| NIT

Rankings

*AP does not release post-NCAA tournament rankings

References

Baylor
Baylor Bears men's basketball seasons
Baylor